was a Japanese football player. He played for Japan national team.

Club career
Iwatani was born in Kobe on October 24, 1925. After graduating from Waseda University, he played for Osaka SC. Osaka SC won second place at the Emperor's Cup three times, in 1951, 1952, and in 1953.

National team career
In March 1951, Iwatani was selected by the Japan national team for its first game after World War II, the 1951 Asian Games. He debuted at this competition on March 7 against Iran. On March 9, he scored two goals against Afghanistan during the match for third place and Japan won 2-0. He also played in the 1954 Asian Games. He played as captain in June 1956 at the 1956 Summer Olympics qualification against South Korea.  Japan finished with one win and one defeat. After the qualifiers, the team drew lots for captain, and he was selected.  The team won the qualification for the 1956 Summer Olympics. However, in November, he was not selected by the Japan team for the Olympics. He played eight games and scored four goals for Japan until 1956.

On March 1, 1970, Iwatani died of a brain tumor in Chuo, Tokyo at the age of 44. In 2006, he was inducted into the Japan Football Hall of Fame.

National team statistics

Honours
Japan
Asian Games Bronze medal: 1951

References

External links
 
 Japan National Football Team Database
Japan Football Hall of Fame at Japan Football Association

1925 births
1970 deaths
Waseda University alumni
Association football people from Hyōgo Prefecture
Japanese footballers
Japan international footballers
Asian Games medalists in football
Footballers at the 1951 Asian Games
Medalists at the 1951 Asian Games
Footballers at the 1954 Asian Games
Asian Games bronze medalists for Japan
Association football forwards